Miami-based American rapper Lil Pump, has released three studio albums, one mixtape, twenty-five singles (including seven as featured artist) and sixteen music videos. In March 2016, Lil Pump released his first single, "Elementary". His first single to hit the Billboard Hot 100 was "Gucci Gang", debuting at number 81 and later peaked at number 3 on the chart. The single is certified four-times platinum by the Recording Industry of America (RIAA). 

In October 2017, he released his eponymous self-titled debut studio album, peaking at number 3 on the Billboard 200, album included songs like "Gucci Gang", "Boss", "D Rose" and "Molly".

Albums

Studio albums

Mixtapes

Singles

As lead artist

As featured artist

Other charted songs

Guest appearances

Music videos

As lead artist

As featured artist

Notes

References

Discography
Discographies of American artists
Hip hop discographies